Jim Marshall may refer to:

Jim Marshall (Georgia politician) (born 1948), a member of the United States House of Representatives
Jim E. Marshall (born 1960), a member of the Pennsylvania House of Representatives
Jim Marshall (British politician) (1941–2004), British politician
Jim Marshall (businessman) (1923–2012), owner and founder of Marshall Amplification
Jim Marshall (defensive end) (born 1937), American football player
Jim Marshall (defensive back) (born 1952), American and Canadian football player
Jim Marshall (baseball) (born 1931), American baseball player and manager
Jim Marshall (coach), head college football coach for the University of Richmond Spiders (1989–1994)
Jim Marshall (photographer) (1936–2010), music photographer
Jim Marshall (Australian footballer) (1882–1950), Australian rules footballer

See also
James Marshall (disambiguation)